Under False Colors is a 1917 American silent drama film produced by the Thanhouser Company and directed by Emile Chautard.

Plot
As described in a film magazine, John Colton (Warde) sends his son Jack (Vaughn) to Russia to compete the details of a loan to that government. While there, Jack assists the Countess Olga (Eagels), who is hounded by spies, out of the country. She sails for America and on the steamer meets Vera Ladislaus (Gregory), who is going to stay with the Coltons. The steamer is torpedoed and Vera loses her life. Olga, on arrival in New York, poses as Vera in order to obtain information in the John Colton home as she has been told that he is aiding the Russian government. After being established in the home, the kindness of the Coltons make her regret her situation. Jack's return home and the arrival of Vera's father complicates matters. However, upon Colton's statement to the assembled Russians at their headquarters that he is really helping the cause of freedom, Olga's true feelings to the Coltons, and especially Jack, are seen.

Cast
Frederick Warde as John Colton
 Robert Vaughn as Jack Colton 
Carey L. Hastings as Mrs. Colton
Jeanne Eagels as Countess Olga  
Anne Gregory as Vera Ladislaus

Production 
Under False Colors was penultimate film produced by Thanhouser. Numerous factors would play into the winding down and eventual closing of the Thanhouser Film Corporation with much advance notice by Edwin Thanhouser. Q. David Bowers writes that it was easy to understand Thanhouser's decision to retire due to numerous aspects including that releases through Pathé were based on their decision to release or discard the work, the New Rochelle studio was 2,500 miles from the center of the trade activity and the slump in industry tied to World War I. Weeks before the film was released, Variety told of the winding down of the Thanhouser with the studio's staff consisting of Edwin Thanhouser and the bookkeeper, Jessie B. Bishop. The article concluded with the announcement that Lloyd F. Lonergan, the scenario writer of the company, had retired from the company. As it wound down, the Thanhouser Company was announced to have no liabilities would close with a positive bank balance. Little is known of the production of this film, but it was directed by Emile Chautard from a scenario written by Lloyd F. Lonergan. The cameraman was Jacques Bizeul.

Release and reception
The five reel film was released through the Pathé Exchange as a Pathé Gold Rooster Play on September 23, 1917.

Survival
The film is presumed to be lost.

References

1917 films
Silent American drama films
American silent feature films
Thanhouser Company films
Lost American films
1917 drama films
Films directed by Emile Chautard
American black-and-white films
Pathé Exchange films
1917 lost films
Lost drama films
1910s American films